John Mark Carrier (born October 28, 1965) is an American former professional football player who was a wide receiver in the National Football League (NFL). He was selected by the Tampa Bay Buccaneers in the third round of the 1987 NFL Draft. He worked for the Carolina Panthers in their front office from 2011 to 2020, and was hired by the Buffalo Bills as their player engagement director in 2021.

Early years
Born and raised in Church Point, Louisiana, Carrier, raised by his mother, was a standout three-sport prep athlete at Church Point high school in football, basketball and track. He was all-state and all-conference as a senior with an average of 22 points and 12 rebounds per game in basketball. In track, he finished 3rd in the state of Louisiana in the 800 meter run after going undefeated the entire year.  In football, he excelled as a receiver, defensive back and returner.  He graduated with honors before attending Nicholls State University.

College career
Carrier played college football at Nicholls State University and was named first-team Associated Press All-American and first-team Kodak All-American by the American Football Coaches Association (AFCA) in 1986.  He finished his football career at Nicholls as the all-time receiving leader in receptions (142), yards (2709), yards per catch (20.4) and 100 yard games (11).  He helped lead his team to the Division 1AA National Championships eventually losing to Georgia Southern in the Quarterfinals, the eventual National Champions. He was voted into the Nicholls State University Hall of Fame. Once he retired for professional football, he later returned to Nicholls and graduated.

Professional career
Carrier, a 6'0", 190-lb. wide receiver, played in 12 National Football League seasons from 1987 to 1998. A 1989 Pro Bowl selection for the Tampa Bay Buccaneers, Carrier caught a career-high 86 receptions for 1,422 yards and 9 touchdowns that year.  After 6 years with the Buccaneers, Carrier signed a 3-year contract with the Cleveland Browns where he experienced his first appearance in the playoffs.  He was selected by the Carolina Panthers in the 1995 NFL Expansion Draft.  Carrier ranks sixth all-time on the Carolina Panthers' all-time receiving list with 176 receptions and fifth in receiving yards with 2,547. On September 1, 1995, Carrier Scored the first NFL points and touchdown in South Carolina (Memorial Stadium, Clemson University aka "Death Valley") for the Carolina Panthers.  One year later, in September 1996, Carrier scored the first NFL touchdown in Charlotte at Ericsson Stadium (now known as Bank of America stadium).  He finished his 12-year career playing in 177 games, with 569 catches for 8763 yards averaging 15.4 yards per catch while scoring 48 touchdowns.  He also average 10.9 yards per return with 229 yards on 21 returns with 1 touchdown.

Front office career
After 12 years of retirement, Carrier returned to the Panthers to serve as director of player development for the Carolina Panthers. He was named senior advisor to the general manager on July 17, 2018, and promoted to executive director of football staff on May 9, 2019.

Carrier was hired by the Buffalo Bills as their player engagement director on March 17, 2021.

References

Nicholls State Colonels media guide

External links
Nicholls State bio

1965 births
Living people
Sportspeople from Lafayette, Louisiana
Players of American football from Louisiana
American football wide receivers
Nicholls Colonels football players
All-American college football players
Tampa Bay Buccaneers players
Cleveland Browns players
Carolina Panthers players
National Conference Pro Bowl players
People from Church Point, Louisiana
Carolina Panthers executives
Buffalo Bills executives